Cyclohexanedimethanol (CHDM) is a mixture of isomeric organic compounds with formula C6H10(CH2OH)2. It is a colorless low-melting solid used in the production of polyester resins.  Commercial samples consist of a mixture of cis and trans isomers.  It is a di-substituted derivative of cyclohexane and is classified as a diol, meaning that it has two OH functional groups.  Commercial CHDM typically has a cis/trans ratio of 30:70.

Applications
Via the process called polycondensation, CHDM is a precursor to polyesters. It is one of the most important comonomers for production of polyethylene terephthalate (PET), or polyethylene terephthalic ester (PETE), from which plastic bottles are made.

Thermoplastic polyesters containing CHDM exhibit enhanced strength, clarity, and solvent resistance. The properties of the polyesters vary from the high melting crystalline poly(1,4-cyclohexylenedimethylene terephthalate), PCT, to the non-crystalline copolyesters derived from both ethylene glycol and CHDM. The properties of these polyesters also is affected by the cis/trans ratio of the CHDM monomer.  CHDM reduces the degree of crystallinity of PET homopolymer, improving its processability. The copolymer tends to resist degradation, e.g. to acetaldehyde. The copolymer with PET is known as glycol-modified polyethylene terephthalate, PETG. PETG is used in many fields, including electronics, automobiles, barrier, and medical, etc.

Production
CHDM is produced by catalytic hydrogenation of dimethyl terephthalate (DMT). The reaction conducted in two steps beginning with the conversion of DMT to the diester dimethyl 1,4-cyclohexanedicarboxylate (DMCD): 
C6H4(CO2CH3)2  +  3 H2   →   C6H10(CO2CH3)2

In the second step DMCD is further hydrogenated to CHDM:
C6H10(CO2CH3)2  + 4 H2   →  C6H10(CH2OH)2  +  2 CH3OH
A copper chromite catalyst is usually used industrially. The cis/trans ratio of the CHDM is affected by the catalyst. 

Byproduct of this process are 4-methylcyclohexanemethanol (CH3C6H10CH2OH) and the monoester methyl
4-methyl-4-cyclohexanecarboxylate (CH3C6H10CO2CH3, CAS registry number 51181-40-9).  The leading producers in CHDM are Eastman Chemical in US and SK Chemicals in South Korea.

References

External links
U.S. National Library of Medicine: Hazardous Substances Databank – 1,4-cyclohexanedimethanol

Monomers
Diols